The Mexico national basketball team (Spanish: Selección de baloncesto de México) represents Mexico in men's international basketball competitions, The team has made five appearances in FIBA World Cup, The governing body of the team is the Asociación Deportiva Mexicana de Básquetbol (ADEMEBA).

In 2013, Mexico won the FIBA AmeriCup.

History

   
Until the late 1960s, team Mexico was a major force at the world stage. The team won the bronze medal at the 1936 Summer Olympics, finished 4th at the 1948 event and 5th in 1968.
Mexico won the Pan American Games silver medal in Winnipeg 1967 led by Captain Carlos Quintanar with players like Arturo Guerrero and Manuel Raga.

At the FIBA Americas Championship 2009 in San Juan, Puerto Rico, Mexico finished 7th, ahead of Panama, Venezuela and the United States Virgin Islands.

On individual performances, Gustavo Ayon finished among the tournament's top performers in steals (3rd), blocks (3rd) and minutes per game (9th).

Both Eduardo Nájera and Earl Watson expressed their interest in representing Mexico internationally. However, neither received permission by their NBA teams to participate at the FIBA Americas Championship 2009 in San Juan, Puerto Rico.

Mexico Beats Team USA
On October 29, 2011, Mexico defeated Team USA 71-55.  This 16 point victory took place during the 2011 Pan Am Games.

"La Edad de Oro" (2013–Present)
Mexico took part in the FIBA Americas Championship 2013 to replace Panama, who were disqualified. To the surprise of many they beat hosts Venezuela in their opening game, and advanced to the second round with wins over Paraguay and the Dominican Republic. They later finished top of the eight-team second round group and a semi-final win over heavy favourites Argentina saw them through to the final.

On 11 September 2013, they beat Puerto Rico 91-83 in the gold medal game to win the FIBA Americas Championship. Inside player Gustavo Ayon was voted as the tournament's Most Valuable Player.

2014 Basketball World Cup
The surprising gold medal at the 2013 FIBA Americas Championship secured Mexico a spot at the 2014 FIBA World Cup in Spain. This marked the first qualification to the Basketball World Cup in 40 years.

At the 2014 FIBA World Cup, the Mexicans won two of their five preliminary round games against Korea and Angola which earned them a playoff spot for the first time in their history. They would, however, come unstuck against eventual champions USA.

Especially noteworthy was Mexico’s 3 point field goal percentage, which was one of the highest among all the teams at the event.

2015 FIBA Americas Championship
Due to Mexico's strong performances of late, the country gained the right to host the 2015 FIBA Americas Championship.

Mexico Defeats Team USA Again
On June 28, 2018, Mexico defeated Team USA 78–70 during the 2019 FIBA Basketball World Cup Qualifiers. Mexico was led by Gustavo Ayon and Juan Toscano-Anderson.  Team USA was led by Alex Caruso, David Stockton, and coached by Jeff Van Gundy.

On November 19, 2021, Mexico defeated Team USA 97–88 during the 2023 FIBA Basketball World Cup Qualifiers. Mexico was led by Orlando Méndez-Valdez (who was also part of Mexico's victory over Team USA in 2018) and Team USA was led by Isaiah Thomas and Luke Kornet.

On September 2, 2022, Mexico defeated Team USA 73–67 during the 2022 FIBA AmeriCup in Recife, Brazil. Mexico was led by Paul Stoll and Fabian Jaimes.  Team USA was led by Jodie Meeks, Patrick McCaw, Frank Mason III, and Norris Cole.

Medals

Olympic Games
Bronze medal: 1936

FIBA AmeriCup
Champions: 2013
Third place: 2017

Pan American Games
Silver medal: 1967, 1991, 2011
Bronze medal: 1983

Centrobasket
Champions: 1965, 1975, 2014
Runners-up: 1991, 2001, 2016
Third place: 1987, 2003

Other awards

FIBA COCABA Championship
Champions: 2006, 2007, 2009, 2013

William Jones Cup
Gold medal: 1990

Central American and Caribbean Games
Silver medal: 2010

FIBA Stanković Continental Champions' Cup
Silver medal: 2015

Competitive record

Summer Olympics

FIBA World Olympic Qualifying Tournament

FIBA World Cup

NOTE:  In June 2018, Mexico beat Team USA 78-70 in the 2019 FIBA Basketball World Cup qualification (Americas).

FIBA AmeriCup

Pan American Games

1951 – 8th place
1955 – 4th place
1959 – 4th place
1963 – 7th place
1967 – Silver medal  (Mexico finished second only to Team USA.  Team Mexico featured one of the 50 Greatest EuroLeague Contributors: Manuel Raga)
1971 – 4th place
1975 – 4th place
1979 – 8th place
1983 – Bronze medal  (This competition was memorable for Mexico taking a 20–4 lead against a Team USA squadron that featured Michael Jordan, Chris Mullin, Sam Perkins, Michael Cage, Ed Pinckney, Mark Price, and Wayman Tisdale. Team USA later came back for an 11-point win: 74–63. Team USA won the gold, Brazil won the silver, and Mexico beat Canada for the bronze medal.)
1987 – 4th place
1991 – Silver medal  (Mexico finished ahead of a Team USA squadron that featured Grant Hill, Christian Laettner, Thomas Hill, Walt Williams, Clarence Weatherspoon, Tracey Murray, Jimmy Jackson, Terry Dehere, Adam Keefe, Eric Montross, and Tony Bennett. Puerto Rico won the gold, Mexico won the silver, and Team USA won the bronze medal.)
1995 – 5th place
2003 – 5th place
2011 – Silver medal  (Mexico beat Team USA 71–55 in their semifinal game.)
2015 – 8th place
2019 – 7th place

Centrobasket – Central American Championships

1965 – Gold Medal  (Team Mexico featured one of the 50 Greatest EuroLeague Contributors: Manuel Raga)
1967 – 4th place
1975 – Gold Medal 
1987 – Bronze Medal 
1989 – 4th place
1991 – Silver Medal 
1997 – 4th place
2001 – Silver Medal 
2003 – Bronze Medal 
2004 – 4th place
2006 – 4th place
2008 – 5th place (Coach Nolan Richardson)
2010 – 6th place
2014 – Gold Medal 
2016 – Silver Medal

FIBA COCABA Championship

2006 – Champions 
2007 – Champions 
2009 – Champions  (Coach: Nolan Richardson)
2013 – Champions 
2015 – 4th place

William Jones Cup
1990 – Champions   (2nd place = Poland, 3rd place = USA)

Central American and Caribbean Games
2010 – Silver medal 
2014 – 5th place

FIBA Stanković Continental Champions' Cup
2015 – Silver medal

Team

Current roster
The roster for the 2022 FIBA AmeriCup.

Former players

Depth chart

Previous squads

Olympics
1936 Olympics squad
1948 Olympics squad
1952 Olympics squad
1960 Olympics squad
1964 Olympics squad
1968 Olympics squad
1976 Olympics squad

FIBA AmeriCup
 1980 Tournament of the Americas squad 
 1984 Tournament of the Americas squad
 1988 Tournament of the Americas squad
 1989 Tournament of the Americas squad
 1992 Tournament of the Americas squad
 1993 Tournament of the Americas squad
 1997 Tournament of the Americas squad
 2001 Tournament of the Americas squad
 2003 Tournament of the Americas squad
 2005 FIBA Americas Championship squad
 2007 FIBA Americas Championship squad
 2009 FIBA Americas Championship squad
 2013 FIBA Americas Championship squad
 2015 FIBA Americas Championship squad
 2017 FIBA AmeriCup squad
 2022 FIBA AmeriCup squad

FIBA World Cup
 2014 FIBA Basketball World Cup squad

Head coach position
 Augustin Garcia (1959)
 Enrique "Kiki" Romero (1960)
 Pedro Barba Ramos (1963)
 Agustin Garcia Arreola (1964)
 Lester Lane (1967–1968)
 Pedro Barba Ramos (1974)
  Carlos Jose Bru (1976)
  Guillermo Vecchio (2003)
  Nolan Richardson (2007)
  Silvio Jose Santander (2008)
  Nolan Richardson (2009)
  Arturo Guerrero (2009)
  Josep Claros (2010–2011)
  Sergio Valdeolmillos (2011)
  Josep Claros (2012)
  Arturo Guerrero (2013)
  Sergio Valdeolmillos (2013–2014)
  Bill Cartwright (2014–2015)
  Sergio Valdeolmillos (2015–2017)
  Ramón Díaz (2018)
  Iván Déniz (2018–2019)
  Sergio Valdeolmillos (2020–2021)
  Omar Quintero (2021-present)

Kit

Manufacturer
2015–2021: Under Armour

2022–present: Titan Sports

See also 
Mexico women's national basketball team
Mexico national under-19 basketball team
Mexico national under-17 basketball team
Mexico national 3x3 team

References

External links
Official website
FIBA Profile
Latinbasket – Mexico Men National Team

Videos
Iran v Mexico - Highlights - 2016 FIBA Olympic Qualifying Tournament - Italy Youtube.com video

 
Men's national basketball teams
1936 establishments in Mexico